The Heist (also known as The Metal Box and Shot Down) is a 2001 heist film produced by Whyte House Productions and Arama Entertainment. It was written and directed by Kurt Voss, and stars Ice-T and Luke Perry. It was released straight-to-DVD on August 14, 2001.

Plot
After three thieves steal an armored truck and kidnap a witness, the abandoned building they use to transfer the cash to another vehicle happens to be the home of Moe, a penniless saxophone player, who is being visited by his small-time criminal brother Jack. While good-natured Moe only wants to save the hostage, Jack wants to steal some of the money in the truck for himself. Meanwhile, two of the thieves plan to betray the third, not knowing that he too has a plan of his own.

External links
 

2001 direct-to-video films
2001 films
2001 crime thriller films
American crime thriller films
American heist films
2000s English-language films
Films directed by Kurt Voss
2000s American films